I Was Born in Buenos Aires is a 1959 Argentine film directed by Francisco Múgica.

Synopsis
The lives of three young locals to making up a typical tango orchestra that leads to Europe.

Cast
Mario Amaya
Alberto Argibay
Santiago Arrieta
Carlos Carella
Mario Fortuna
Gilda Lousek
Oscar Orlegui
Ignacio Quirós
María Luisa Robledo
Isabel Sánchez
Enzo Viena

External links
 

1959 films
1950s Spanish-language films
Argentine black-and-white films
Films directed by Francisco Múgica
1950s Argentine films